Pamplona Province was one of the provinces of Gran Colombia. It belonged to the Boyacá Department which was created in 1824.

Provinces of Gran Colombia
Provinces of the Republic of New Granada